Summers T. Hardy (May 23, 1875October 18, 1950) was a native of Arkansas who came to Indian Territory in with his family in 1892, settling in what would become Ardmore, Oklahoma. He read law and passed the bar exam in 1897, then entered private law practice in Ardmore and Madill, Oklahoma. Hardy met a young woman from Texas in Ardmore named Laura Scribner, whom he married in 1900. He got into local politics and was elected as a delegate to the Oklahoma Constitutional Convention in 1906. He was named President of the Madill City School board in 1907–1908. He ran for a District 16 judgeship in Marshall County and won, serving 1911–1913, then served briefly in District 29 in 1914.

Early life
Summers T. Hardy was born in Van Buren County, Arkansas on May 23, 1875, to Henry and Martha (Underwood) Hardy. As a young man, Henry was a farmer and blacksmith, and became a local Methodist preacher as he grew older. He was also elected to the state legislature as a Democratic representative until 1885. Then, Henry moved his family to Montague County, Texas, where he was elected twice as county judge, for a total of four years. After his term ended, he moved to Ardmore (then in Oklahoma Territory, where Henry died in 1895 at age 43.

Young Hardy grew up on farms, was educated in public schools and had some commercial training. He was then hired as a clerk in the local post office, while completing a course in stenography. He used this training to get hired by the local Garrett and Hardy law firm, while he also read the law and passed the bar exam in 1897.

Legal career in Oklahoma
In 1900, Hardy Summers and his brother Garret formed a partnership with Mr. Garrett in Madill, Oklahoma. Hardy became particularly interested in "citizenship cases." One such, Archards v. McGahey, et. al., No. 1,. The decision was considered a notable win for the Hardy firm.

Politically, Hardy identifies himself as a strong democrat and a prohibitionist. In 1906, the Oklahoma Democratic Party selected him as one of its speakers trying to convince voters in Oklahoma Territory that they should support the proposed Oklahoma Constitution.

Oklahoma Supreme Court
At age 29, in 1914, Hardy was elected to a 6-year term (1915–21) as an associate justice of the Oklahoma Supreme Court, making him one of the youngest men ever to serve on the highest court in the state. He was named Chief Justice for 1917-18.

After serving on the State Supreme Court, Summers resigned from public service on May 1, 1919, and moved to Tulsa, where he became General Counsel for Harry Sinclair and the Sinclair Oil Companies. He and his wife bought a lot in the very fashionable Maple Ridge Historic District subdivision, where they had an architect build a two-story Prairie Style residence at 1702 South Madison Avenue. The house still stands today, serving as an elegant private residence.

Involvement with Harry Sinclair 
Harry Sinclair became a major donor to the national Republican Party, whose standard-bearer, Warren G. Harding, won the 1920 Presidential election. During Harding's first term, the infamous Teapot Dome Scandal erupted, engulfing much of the Harding administration and many major supporters in charges of official corruption regarding sale of oil leases. It is unclear when the retired Justice Summers left the Sinclair organization (though he was not accused of any wrongdoing), but the scandal ruined Sinclair and caused his oil empire to be completely dismantled and sold piecemeal to other companies.

Tulsa University College of Law activities
The Tulsa Preservation Commission has reported that Judge Hardy was instrumental in founding the University of Tulsa College of Law, and served as its first dean from 1943–1949. The Hardys continued to live in the Maplewood house during that time.

Death
Hardy died at his home in Tulsa, Oklahoma after suffering a stroke.

Notes

References

1875 births
1950 deaths
People from Van Buren County, Arkansas
People from Ardmore, Oklahoma
People from Madill, Oklahoma
People from Tulsa, Oklahoma
School board members in Oklahoma
Justices of the Oklahoma Supreme Court
University of Tulsa College of Law faculty
Oklahoma Democrats